Alireza Abbasfard (born 20 October 1981) is an Iranian footballer who currently plays for Naft va Gaz Gachsaran in the Iran 2nd division football league. He previously played for Rah Ahan and Esteghlal. He usually plays in centre forward position.

Club career
He joined Rah Ahan in 2011 under Ali Daei management. In last days of 2013 he joined Malaysian Super League side Sarawak and being first Iranian to play in Malaysian League.

Club career statistics
Last Update  24 Feb 2014 

 Assist Goals

International career

Scores and results list Iran's goal tally first.

Honours
Iran's Premier Football League
Winner: 1
2008–09 with Esteghlal

References

1981 births
Living people
Sportspeople from Tehran
Iranian footballers
Iran international footballers
Iranian expatriate footballers
Persian Gulf Pro League players
Bargh Shiraz players
Association football midfielders
Esteghlal F.C. players
Saba players
Saipa F.C. players
Paykan F.C. players
Rah Ahan players
21st-century Iranian people